Jane Juska (March 7, 1933 – October 24, 2017) was an American author and retired schoolteacher whose first book, A Round-Heeled Woman: My Late-Life Adventures in Sex and Romance (2003), documented her search for sex at 67 years of age by putting a literary personal ad in the New York Review of Books.

Sharon Gless starred in Jane Prowse's stage adaptation, A Round-Heeled Woman: the play, which had its first production in San Francisco in 2010.  A new production, directed by Jane Prowse, who also adapted the book for the stage, ran from December 2010 to February 2011 in Miami. The play documented the 63 replies to her personal ad in the Review with a 2003 memoir, A Round-Heeled Woman, that became a West-End play.

Juska wrote a follow-up, Unaccompanied Women: Late-Life Adventures in Love, Sex, and Real Estate five years later, which continued to document her desire to find a man to keep her company.  In addition, it chronicles her globe-trotting adventures, due in part to her travels surrounding her first book. She died on October 24, 2017 at the age of 84.

References

External links
 A Round-Heeled Woman: the play.  The official site
 National Review Online article
 CBS News article on Juska and her book

1933 births
2017 deaths
Writers from Ann Arbor, Michigan
21st-century American women writers
University of Michigan alumni
American women non-fiction writers
21st-century American non-fiction writers